7835 Myroncope is an asteroid of the Mitidika family from the central region of the asteroid belt. It was discovered on 16 June 1993, by American astronomer Timothy Spahr at the Catalina Station in Arizona, United States. It was named in memory of American sports announcer Myron Cope (1929–2008).

Classification and orbit 

Myroncope has been identified as a member of the Mitidika family, a dispersed asteroid family of typically carbonaceous C-type asteroids. The family is named after 2262 Mitidika (diameter of 9 km) and consists of 653 known members, the largest ones being 404 Arsinoë (95 km) and 5079 Brubeck (17 km).

The asteroid orbits the Sun in the central main-belt at a distance of 2.0–3.2 AU once every 4 years and 1 month (1,489 days). Its orbit has an eccentricity of 0.23 and an inclination of 13° with respect to the ecliptic. The first identification of this asteroid was made at the Japanese Geisei Observatory in 1990. However the observation was excluded from the asteroid's orbit determination and did not extend its observation arc prior to its discovery.

Naming 

This minor planet was named in memory of famed sports announcer and journalist Myron Cope (1929–2008). He was a color commentator for the Pittsburgh Steelers National Football League team for 35 years and was the creator of the Terrible Towel in 1975. The  was published by the Minor Planet Center on 20 May 2008.

Physical characteristics

Diameter and albedo 

According to the survey carried out by the NEOWISE mission of NASA's Wide-field Infrared Survey Explorer, Myroncope measures 10.8 kilometers in diameter and its surface has an albedo of 0.08. The Collaborative Asteroid Lightcurve Link assumes a standard albedo for stony asteroids of 0.20 and calculates a smaller diameter of 6.2 kilometers based on an absolute magnitude of 13.4.

Rotation period and poles 

In 2016, the asteroid's lightcurve has been modeled using data from Lowell photometric database, which gave a sidereal rotation period of 7.43019 hours, as well as two spin axes of (72.0°, −64.0°) and (288.0°, −55.0°) in ecliptic coordinates (λ, β).

References

External links 
 Lightcurve Database Query (LCDB), at www.minorplanet.info
 Dictionary of Minor Planet Names, Google books
 Asteroids and comets rotation curves, CdR – Geneva Observatory, Raoul Behrend
 Discovery Circumstances: Numbered Minor Planets (5001)-(10000) – Minor Planet Center
 
 

007835
Discoveries by Timothy B. Spahr
Named minor planets
19930616